James Brian Florence (born May 31, 1988) is an American professional basketball player for Arka Gdynia of the Polish Basketball League. Standing at 1.86 m, he plays the point guard position.

College career
Florence played college basketball for the Mercer Bears from 2006–2010.

Professional career
Florence has also played professionally in the basketball leagues of Bosnia and Herzegovina, Ukraine, Hungary and Germany as well as in the EuroChallenge and Adriatic League competitions with Szolnoki Olaj.

In August 2014 he signed a one-year contract with the Croatian side KK Zadar. On March 15, 2015, he left Zadar. Three days later he signed with TED Ankara Kolejliler of Turkey for the rest of the 2014–15 Turkish Basketball League season.

On July 6, 2015, Florence signed a one-year contract with Paris-Levallois of the French LNB Pro A. On October 15, 2015, he parted ways with Paris after appearing in four league games. The next day, he signed with the Croatian club Cibona Zagreb for the rest of the season.

On July 21, 2016, Florence signed a one-year deal with Polish club Stelmet Zielona Góra. With Zielona Góra he won the 2016–17 PLK championship and was named the PLK Finals MVP, after averaging 16.4 points and 3.2 assists per game over the series. On June 30, 2017, he re-signed with Zielona Góra for one more season.

On July 28, 2018, Florence signed with Asseco Gdynia in Poland.

On August 18, 2019, Florence signed with Champville SC of the Lebanese League.

On December 11, 2019, Florence signed with BC Astana of the VTB United League.

On June 24, 2020, Florence signed with Stal Ostrów Wielkopolski of the Polish Basketball League (PLK).

On July 30, 2022, he has signed with Arka Gdynia of the Polish Basketball League for a second stint.

References

External links
 James Florence at fiba.com
 James Florence at eurobasket.com

Living people
1988 births
ABA League players
American expatriate basketball people in Bosnia and Herzegovina
American expatriate basketball people in Croatia
American expatriate basketball people in France
American expatriate basketball people in Germany
American expatriate basketball people in Hungary
American expatriate basketball people in Kazakhstan
American expatriate basketball people in Lebanon
American expatriate basketball people in Poland
American expatriate basketball people in Turkey
American expatriate basketball people in Ukraine
American men's basketball players
Asseco Gdynia players
Basketball Löwen Braunschweig players
Basketball players from Marietta, Georgia
Basket Zielona Góra players
BC Astana players
KK Cibona players
KK Igokea players
KK Zadar players
Mercer Bears men's basketball players
Metropolitans 92 players
Point guards
Stal Ostrów Wielkopolski players
Szolnoki Olaj KK players
TED Ankara Kolejliler players